South  Paravur is a small village near Udayamperoor, India. It is part of Kanayannur taluk of Ernakulam district. Its name distinguishes it from the town with the same name in the northern end of Ernakulam district. Vembanad lake is nearby.

See also
 Paravur, Kollam place with same near Kollam
 Paravur, Alappuzha place with same near Alappuzha
 North Paravur, a town in Ernakulam with same name

References 

Villages in Ernakulam district